The Language Grid is a multilingual service platform on the Internet mainly for supporting Intercultural collaboration. It enables easy registration and sharing of language resources such as online dictionaries, bilingual corpora, and machine translations.

Concept 
The Language Grid is developed to increase the accessibility and usability of language resources. It takes the service-oriented approach by wrapping existing language resources as atomic Web services and enables users to compose new services by combining atomic Web services.

Architecture 
The architecture of the Language Grid is to increase the usability of language resources, and to decrease the risk to providers in opening their resources. By wrapping resources as services, providers can control their intellectual property rights. It is essential to define stakeholders, their roles and the social protocol among them. Every stakeholder related to service grids, a service grid user, can take one or more roles in the following three categories.

 Service provider wraps language resources into language services, and deploys them on a grid. When registering services, access control policies can be specified for each service.
 Service consumer invokes registered language services from an application system. When invoking a composite language service, the request is sent to a workflow engine, which executes a workflow that combines one or more atomic language services.
 Grid operator manages and controls a service grid for service providers and consumers. Each service grid has a grid operator.

The institutional agreement reflects the intentions of the three roles of service grid users. From service providers’ point of view, protection of intellectual property rights is critical. To satisfy such demands, service usage is classified into the following three categories:

 Non-profit use: services are used in public or non-profit settings. 
 Research use: services intended to advance the field, not for commercial profit. 
 For-profit use: services for commercial profit regardless of the type of organization.

Even in for-profit organizations, social responsibility activities are classified as non-profit use. This is because such activities are often conducted with public institutions or non-profit organizations. Conversely, the activities of public institutions or non-profit organizations for commercial profit are classified as for-profit use.

Software 
The Language Grid consists of four service layers: P2P Service Grid Layer, Atomic Service Layer, Composite Service Layer and Application System Layer. The P2P Service Grid Layer is constructed by the Service Grid Server Software. 

The main components are Service Supervisor and Grid Composer. The Service Supervisor controls service invocations according to the access control policies registered by service providers. Before service consumers invoke services on Composite Service Container and Atomic Service Container, it verifies whether the request satisfies the providers' access control policies. On the other hand, the Grid Composer coordinates distributed service grids operated by different grid operators in order to connect regional language services. 

The Service Grid Server Software was developed by Language Grid Project, National Institute of Information and Communications Technology. The development started in 2006. From April 2010, this is an open-sourced software maintained by the open source project. The software is used to build the Language Grid, and also employed by LAPPS Grid funded by NSF.

Operation 
The Department of Social Informatics of Kyoto University started single operation of the Language Grid in December 2007 for non-profit purpose and research purpose, which is named as Language Grid Kyoto Operation Center. In January 2011, the second operation center for Language Grid was started by the National Electronics and Computer Technology Center of Thailand, which is called Language Grid Bangkok Operation Center. Later, Language Grid Jakarta Operation Center in Indonesia and Language Grid Xinjiang Operation in China were started in 2012 and 2014 respectively. 

The four operation centers are connected with each other to realize the federated operation of the Language Grid, which enables sharing of language services among multiple Language Grids.

In May 2017, the operation of Kyoto Language Grid was moved from Kyoto University to NPO Language Grid Association. As of May 2018, 183 groups in 24 countries and regions had joined the Kyoto Language Grid, and 226 services are shared in the Federated Language Grid.

Researches
Researches of developing and using the Language Grid cover several areas including artificial intelligence, services computing and human-computer interaction.

Since 2006, research funds of the Language Grid have been provided by National Institute of Information and Communications Technology, Japan Society for the Promotion of Science, Strategic Information and Communications R&D Promotion Programme of the Ministry of Internal Affairs and Communications in Japan, and Research Institute of Science and Technology for Society of Japan Science and Technology Agency.

In November 2015, a research collaboration of federated grid for language services was started among the Language Grid, European Language Resources Association and Linguistic Data Consortium.

Activities
By using the language services in different ways based on the Language Grid, activities have been conducted by different communities. In 2006, Language Grid Association was formed among industry, government, academia, and citizens to advance the technologies and applications of the Language Grid.

Foreign Patient Support at Hospitals 
When foreigners fall ill in different countries, they may be unable to receive adequate medical attention because of their inability to communicate with Japanese medical doctors. The multilingual medical communication support system was developed by Wakayama University in cooperation with Kyoto Center for Multicultural Society. This NPO dispatched volunteer interpreters to several affiliated hospitals a total of 1700 times per year. The support system helps communication between foreign outpatients and medical staff at hospital reception desks. Using the system, hospital staff can ask outpatients about their symptoms, and provide guidance around each section in a hospital.

Multilingual agricultural support 
NPO Pangaea and universities in Japan and Vietnam worked on an agricultural support project with two major goals: low rice productivity and the environmental burdens caused by the excessive use of agrichemicals. From 2011 to 2014, a four-month experiment was conducted each year in Vinh Long Province, which is located in the Mekong Delta. The goal was to provide timely and appropriate agriculture knowledge in rice harvesting to Vietnamese farmers by Japanese experts. Since Japanese experts cannot physically travel to all rural areas, they were highly motivated to use the Language Grid. However, because of the low literacy rate in those areas, the farmers had difficulties in using computers and in reading or writing messages. The youth-mediated communication (YMC) model was invented, where children act as mediators and bridge the gaps in language, knowledge and cultures between experts and farmers.

References

External links
 Language Grid Portal Site

2007 establishments in Japan
Internet properties established in 2007
Kyoto University
Linguistics websites
Corpora
Computational linguistics